Plagio is an Italian term deriving from the Latin "plagium". The Italian criminal code defined it as "Whoever submits a person to his own power, in order to reduce her to a state of subjection, is punished with imprisonment for five to fifteen years". Such a crime has not been prosecuted in Italy since 1981.

Annulment

The crime of plagio had rarely been prosecuted in Italy, and only one person, Aldo Braibanti, was ever convicted after the Second World War, for his relations with a younger man he was accused of brainwashing into communism and homosexuality in 1964. It was later declared unconstitutional by the Constitutional Court with decision no. 96 of 8 June 1981. The court found the law to be so vague that it failed to meet the criteria set out in Article. 25 of the Constitution. Specifically, the substance of the crime was impossible to fully assess with logical-rational criteria, creating an intolerable risk of arbitrary prosecution and conviction.

A few years after the declaration of unconstitutionality of the plagio at the presence of Leonetto Amadei, the President of the Constitutional Court of the Italian Republic, Mario Di Fiorino organized a scientific conference in Forte dei Marmi in 1989 on "Socially accepted persuasion, plagio and brainwashing", for the discuss of the new situation.

References

Law of Italy